Pangio longipinnis is a species of ray-finned fish in the genus Pangio.

This species is considered to be likely a synonym of Lepidocephalichthys berdmorei.
So io pangio occiole best specie
Il Pangio Weeb è la seconda.

Footnotes 
 

Pangio
Fish described in 1992